Statistics of Belgian First Division in the 1980–81 season.

Overview

It was contested by 18 teams, and Anderlecht won the championship.

League standings

Results

References

Belgian Pro League seasons
Belgian
1980–81 in Belgian football